Taina Elisabeth Elg (born 9 March 1930) is a Finnish-American actress and dancer. She has appeared on stage, television, and in film.

Career
Elg was born in 1930 in Helsinki, and raised in Turku by her parents, Åke Elg (né Ludwig), a Finnish pianist, and Helena Doroumova (who was of Russian descent). She was signed to a seven-year contract to Metro-Goldwyn-Mayer in the mid-1950s. In 1957, she won the Golden Globe for the Foreign Newcomer Award – Female. She won another Golden Globe in 1958 for Best Motion Picture Actress – Musical/Comedy for her performance in Les Girls, tying with her co-star, the famed and well-established Kay Kendall.

In 1958, she was nominated for a Golden Laurel as Top New Female Personality. In 1959 she starred alongside Kenneth More in The 39 Steps. In 1975, she was nominated for a Tony Award for her performance as Donna Lucia D'Alvadorez in Where's Charley?. She appeared in the original Broadway production of Nine as Guido Contini's mother. In 1989, she had the title role as Lea in Chéri, from a Colette novel as adapted by Anita Loos. In 1980, she played Dr. Ingrid Fischer on CBS daytime drama soap opera Guiding Light. From 1980–82, she played Olympia Buchanan, first wife of tycoon Asa Buchanan, on the ABC soap opera One Life to Live. Her character, held prisoner by Asa for months, had a memorable death sequence, falling over a balcony at a costume party.

Personal life
Her son by her first marriage to Carl-Gustav Björkenheim, which ended in divorce in 1960, is Finnish-American jazz guitarist Raoul Björkenheim. In 1985, Elg married Rocco Caporale, an Italian-born educator and professor of sociology. She lives in New York City.

Filmography

The Prodigal (1955)
Diane (1956)
Gaby (1956)
Les Girls (1957)
Imitation General (1958)
The 39 Steps (1959)
Watusi (1959)
The Bacchantes (1961)
Hercules in New York (1970)
Liebestraum (1991)
The Mirror Has Two Faces (1996)

Stage appearances
Look to the Lilies
Two By Two (U.S. national tour)
Nine
Where's Charley?
The Utter Glory of Morrissey Hall
A Little Night Music (in Australia)
Chéri (off-Broadway, New York)

References

External links

Soap Central character brief

1930 births
Living people
People from Turku
Finnish emigrants to the United States
Finnish film actresses
Finnish people of Russian descent
American soap opera actresses
Finnish television actresses
American film actresses
American musical theatre actresses
American television actresses
Best Foreign Newcomer Golden Globe winners
Best Musical or Comedy Actress Golden Globe (film) winners
Metro-Goldwyn-Mayer contract players
American female dancers
American dancers
Finnish female dancers
21st-century American women